2011–12 season of Argentine football is the 121st season of competitive football in Argentina.

National teams

Men's
This section covers Argentina men's matches from August 1, 2011, to July 31, 2012.

Friendlies

2014 World Cup qualifiers

External links
AFA
Argentina on FIFA.com
Soloascenso.com.ar

 
Seasons in Argentine football